Tom Sturges (born June 22, 1956) is an American music executive, author, mentor, educator, and public speaker.

Sturges has over thirty years of music industry experience, serving as president of Chrysalis Music, EVP/Head of Creative for Universal Music Publishing Group, and VP/GM of Shaquille O'Neals T.W.Is.M Records. A passionate advocate of creative thinking, Sturges authored 5 books and is a regular guest speaker/panelist. He has also been an active Grammy member for thirty plus years, and previously served as a trustee and the president for the LA chapter.

Tom is currently an independent music publisher, a professor at UCLA, and a dedicated father of three based in Los Angeles.

Early life
Born in France, Sturges is one of only seven Americans baptized at Cathédrale Notre-Dame de Paris. Sturges is the third son of Preston Sturges, the Hollywood screenwriter and director who passed away when Tom was three years old, and Anne Margaret "Sandy" Nagle (1927-2006). At age 14, Tom sued his mother for the right to his own custody and won the case, a first time in favor of a minor. Sturges graduated from University of California, Davis in 1979 with a BA in music, and attended graduate school at the University of California, Los Angeles.

Music career

Arista Music Publishing 
Sturges entered the industry as an intern at Arista Music Publishing in 1980. A month into his internship, Tom took a secretarial position in the copyright department where he typed copyright forms and sent telexes. Despite not working in a creative role, Sturges built a rapport and friendship with Clive Davis (then President of Arista Records) and began pitching him songs. Tom's attuned ear soon got him promoted to a creative executive position as a Professional Manager. Three years later, Sturges left the company to become a songplugger at Screen Gems/EMI.

Screen Gems/EMI 
In 1983, Sturges was onboarded as a General Professional Manager for Lester Sill's Screen Gems/EMI after Chuck Kaye recommended him. During his time there, Tom played a central role in placing hits like "Another Night" by Aretha Franklin and "We Belong" by Pat Benatar. He also worked closely with Gerry Goffin, Katrina & The Waves, and worked with Carole King write Anne Murray's #1 country single, "Time Don't Run Out on Me".

Chrysalis Music Group 
In 1985, Sturges began working for Chrysalis Music Group as senior VP/ General Manager of the company. Sturges helped Chrysalis Publishing achieve five No. 1 singles, 22 gold and/or platinum albums, and eight albums achieved multiplatinum status. In 1989, Sturges assumed the role of President of Chrysalis where he signed artists, including Smashing Pumpkins, Goodie Mob, OutKast, Green Jelly, Slaughter, Billy Burnette of Fleetwood Mac, as well as songwriters like Antonina Armato ("She Ain't Worth It", "I'll Get By"), Andy Hill ("Restless Heart", "Peace in Our Time"), and Kipper Jones. Further, Tom engineered the purchase of the Ring-A-Ding Music catalogue (which features the songs of rockabilly artist Dorsey Burnette "It's Late", and "Believe What You Say"),  the Roy Ayers song catalog, and oversaw the revitalization of the Paul Anka catalog. Throughout his time at Chrysalis, Sturges stayed true to his song-plugging roots and pitched songs that became charting hits for artists, including Aretha Franklin ("I Knew You Were Waiting", Grammy-winning worldwide #1 duet hit with George Michael), Cher (#1 pop single "Heart Of Stone"), Celine Dion ("Think Twice"), Mariah Carey, and Whitney Houston.

T.W.Is.M Records 
After eleven years, Sturges left Chrysalis in 1996, and became the VP/GM of T.W.Is.M Records (Shaquille O'Neal's record label and publishing company). Tom ran Shaq's record company until 1999, sharing that "like all good things, it came to an end".

Universal Music Publishing Group 
Sturges then became the Executive Vice President and Head of Creative for Universal Music Publishing Group (UMPG). Sturges (working under the leadership of Zach Horowitz) contributed to the company's immense growth over the years through his talent acquisition. While at UMPG, Tom signed artists including Afroman, 3 Doors Down, 50 Cent, Foo Fighters, Stone Temple Pilots, Jack Johnson, Owl City, Vanessa Carlton, and Chris Brown, as well as writers/producers Mark Batson, Rock Mafia, and Sean Garrett. Inspired by executives like John Hammond, Sturges believes that his successful music career stems from his musical literacy/talent, and his ability to detect talent in others (artists & writers, or talented creative execs to work with). Sturges retired from UMPG in 2011.

Authorship
When Tom Sturges became a father, he wanted to be the greatest father who ever walked the earth. "I wanted to be so much more than a casual observer of my son's life as it went by me." Sturges' exploration resulted in a host parenting and self-help novels that encourage creativity, including: 
 (2008) Parking Lot Rules & 75 Other Ideas for Raising Amazing Children, a practical, inspiring "rule book" for raising healthy, happy, safe, cherished children; a collection of ideas, advice, and tips from parents, grandparents, rock stars and sports legends–anyone with unique insights to share.
 (2011) Grow the Tree You Got: & 99 Other Ideas for Raising Amazing Adolescents and Teenagers, a wise and inspiring guide to parenting through the extraordinary–and at times tumultuous–journey that is the adolescent and teenage years.
 (2014) Every Idea Is A Good Idea: Be Creative Anytime, Anywhere, a method whereby the average person can more easily access that part of the mind to solve problems and achieve dreams in any artistic field, from music and art to fashion or home design.
 (2021) A Good Divorce Begins Here: A Guide to Surviving and Thriving Afterward, a personal exploration into life after divorce, documenting how a marriage can just come to a conclusion with dignity for both sides. 
In 2019, Sturges wrote a biographic novel about his father, writer-director Preston Sturges', concentrating on the later (and more mysterious) years of his life. After Tom's mother passed away in 2006, he discovered that she had kept all her correspondence with his father, as well as his papers, journals and diaries. Tom collaborated on the book with British author Nick Smedley, and included glimpses of those discovered notebooks, and descriptive "interludes" that elucidate Preston's personal life. Tom is the youngest of Preston's children. 
 (2019) Preston Sturges: The Last Years of Hollywood's First Writer-Director
Tom is a contributor for the Huffington Post, and appeared on KTLA, Fox & Friends, CNN, and theToday Show. His contributions have been featured in publications including Best Life magazine, CNN, Fast Company, People, and The New York Times.

Philanthropy 
Sturges embraces music education with a holistic spirit of generativity. Tom lost his own father when he was 3 years old—a loss he likened to losing a limb–driving him to be an "über-Dad" to his three sons (Thomas, Sam, and Kian) and to bring a paternal spirit to his work as an educator and mentor. Sturges has received over 42 commendations for his volunteerism.

'Witness to a Dream' 
Tom's first philanthropic mentorship program began in 1998 through an informal beginning. Sturges went to speak at the Foshay Learning Center in South Los Angeles, and just kept doing it––every Wednesday for the next many years. Tom's creative workshop mentored a total of 233 inner-city high school students from 1998-2011.

Tom began working with his first group of mentees when they were in 7th grade. He helped them write songs and served as the choir director until their high school graduation. Tom was available by phone for anything they needed––whether for school or personal support. In 2003, the first 30-plus member Foshay Choir celebrated their release of "Witness to a Dream," an original CD the students created under Tom's mentorship. The CD contains five songs, two spoken word pieces, a solo rap piece and a new arrangement of The Star Spangled Banner. Proceeds from the project went to the Foshay Learning Center and to a scholarship trust fund for choir members. All of the graduating seniors participants made plans to attend college and twelve of the mentees attended USC with full scholarships.

Sturges shared that the Witness to a Dream project "symbolizes the powerful impact that mentoring and service to the community brings to our youth." The Foshay Choir opened on the Disneyland competition, with then-Secretary of State Colin Powell and then-Gov. Pete Wilson in the audience. The Choir also later performed three times for President Obama's re-election efforts. Tom's success with the first group of mentees at the Forshay Learning Center are the subject of the 2008 documentary, Witness to a Dream. The documentary depicts Tom's mentorship beginning when the students were in 7th grade (in 1997) to their eventual graduation from college (in 2007). Tom's creative and hands-on philanthropic workshop at Foshay continued until 2011.

Grandview Elementary Music Program 
Inspired by his work at Foshay Learning Center, Sturges wanted to create a similar music-centered program geared for younger students. Sturges designed and implemented a creative workshop for fifth-graders as a volunteer teacher at Grandview Elementary in Manhattan Beach––where his children went to school. He taught more than 1,000 students for over 14 years. Tom's Grandview program allows students to experience a creative process in five sessions; some students write a play or a poem, others paint a picture or sculpt. Through fearless creativity, students gained confidence in their ideas and learned how to articulate them to their classmates in a fun and challenging way.

Music Educator 
Sturges' passion for creativity, music, and mentorship drive his desire to educate others on the intricacies of the industry. Sturges is a guest speaker at numerous venues throughout the year and serves as an active professor at UCLA (see below).

Guest Speaker/Panelist 

 Aspen Ideas Festival: Sturges participated in the Hip Hop Intellectuals Panel at the 2011 Aspen Ideas Festival. In 2013, he served as an institute contributor and guest speaker for the Aspen Challenge, where teams from 20 schools within the Los Angeles Unified School District (LAUSD) are challenged to design solutions by inspirational speakers and entrepreneurs who work everyday on today's tough issues.
 GRAMMY Camp Creativity Panel: In 2014, Sturges headed the 7th annual GRAMMY camp panel on creativity and providing hands-on instruction for high schoolers interested in entering the music industry.
 Clive Davis Institute of Recorded Music: He briefly joined the advisory board for the NYU Clive Davis Institute of Recorded Music. As a board members, Sturges offered advice and guidance to help provide Recorded Music students with opportunities for learning beyond the classroom walls.

UCLA Professor 
Sturges continues to give back to the Los Angeles community and continues his creative mentoring as an active Music Industry professor at UCLA.

In 2001, Tom helped co-created the UCLA Music Business Now class with fellow music executives Jeff Jampol, Steve Berman and Lenny Beer. The class is a required course in UCLA's Music Industry degree program, offering a hands-on introduction to business of music with an emphasis on marketing and media. For over twenty years, Sturges has facilitated collaborative students-run teams designed to develop marketing strategies for real-world artists. Tom also offers a supplementary hour-long song writing workshop.

Production 
During the 1980s, Sturges had 12 of his father's screenplays published by the University of California Press to preserve them, and began shopping his father's unproduced screenplays. Tom edited a volume of his father's letters, and several of his father's scripts produced for the screen and stage, such as the play "A Cup of Coffee" produced by Marlene Swartz.

References

External links
 "Tom Sturges website"

1956 births
Living people
UCLA School of the Arts and Architecture alumni
University of California, Davis alumni